Plesiocystiscus jewettii is a species of minute predatory sea snail, a marine gastropod mollusk in the family Cystiscidae.

References

Cystiscidae
Gastropods described in 1856
Taxa named by Philip Pearsall Carpenter